The spin stiffness or spin rigidity or helicity modulus or the "superfluid density" (for bosons the superfluid density is proportional to the spin stiffness) is a constant which represents the change in the ground state energy of a spin system as a result of introducing a slow in plane twist of the spins. The importance of this constant is in its use as an indicator of quantum phase transitions—specifically in models with metal-insulator transitions such as Mott insulators. It is also related to other topological invariants such as the Berry phase and Chern numbers as in the Quantum Hall effect.

Mathematically
Mathematically it can be defined by the following equation: 

where  is the ground state energy,  is the twisting angle, and N is the number of lattice sites.

Spin stiffness of the Heisenberg model

Start off with the simple Heisenberg spin Hamiltonian:

Now we introduce a rotation in the system at site i by an angle θi around the z-axis:

Plugging these back into the Heisenberg Hamiltonian:

now let θij = θi - θj and expand around θij = 0 via a MacLaurin expansion only keeping terms up to second order in θij

where the first term is independent of θ and the second term is a perturbation for small θ.

 is the z-component of the spin current operator
  is the "spin kinetic energy"

Consider now the case of identical twists, θx only that exist along nearest neighbor bonds along the x-axis
Then since the spin stiffness is related to the difference in the ground state energy by

then for small θx and with the help of second order perturbation theory we get:

See also
 Spin wave

References

Quantum mechanics
Magnetism
Statistical mechanics